HSwMS Magne was a torpedo boat destroyer of the Royal Swedish Navy. Magne was built by the British shipbuilder Thornycroft, launching in 1905. She was employed on neutrality patrol and escort duties during the First World War and was sold for scrap in 1943.

Design
The new destroyer, to be called Magne, and based on Thornycroft's  built for Japan, was ordered from Yarrow's British rival Thornycroft in July 1904, for a price of £50,000.

Displacement was  full load. Like Mode, Magne had a turtleback forecastle, although Magnes turtleback was longer, and four funnels. Armament consisted of six 57-mm QF guns, with two 450 mm (18-inch) torpedo tubes mounted aft. Crew was 67 officers and other ranks.

Construction and service

Magne was built by Thornycroft at their Chiswick, London yard, as yard number 378, and was launched on 2 August 1905. She reached a speed of  during acceptance sea trials, before delivery to Sweden to have her armament fitted. Magne formed the basis of the design for Sweden's next four destroyers,  and the three ), which were built between 1907 and 1909 in Swedish shipyards.

After arming, Magne was deployed with Mode to the West coast of Sweden during the crisis that preceded the dissolution of the Union between Sweden and Norway. During the First World War, Magne was used to patrol neutral Sweden's waters and for escort duties, and in 1916 forced the  out of Swedish waters near Gotland.

Magne was laid up at the end of 1918, and was stricken in 1936. She was then used as a target before being sold for scrap in 1943.

Notes

References

Bibliography
 
 
 

Destroyers of the Swedish Navy
Ships built in Chiswick
1905 ships